The 1975 Italian Open was a combined men's and women's tennis tournament that was played by men on outdoor clay courts at the Foro Italico in Rome, Italy. The men's and women's tournament was part of the 1975 Commercial Union Assurance Grand Prix. It was the 32nd edition of the tournament and was held from 26 May through 3 June 1975. The singles titles were won by Raúl Ramírez and Chris Evert.

Prize money

Source: World of Tennis '76

Finals

Men's singles
 Raúl Ramírez defeated  Manuel Orantes 7–6, 7–5, 7–5

Women's singles
 Chris Evert defeated  Martina Navratilova 6–1, 6–0

Men's doubles
 Brian Gottfried /  Raúl Ramírez defeated  Jimmy Connors /  Ilie Năstase 6–4, 7–6, 2–6, 6–1

Women's doubles
 Chris Evert /  Martina Navratilova defeated  Sue Barker /  Glynis Coles 6–1, 6–2

See also
 Evert–Navratilova rivalry

References

External links
 ITF – Tournament edition details

Italian Open
Italian Open (tennis)
Italian Open
Italian Open
Italian Open
1975 in Italian tennis